Stokovna Kukja NaMa is a department store built in 1960, it represents an early example of modernist architecture in North Macedonia. The building is centrally located in Macedonia Square, Skopje in the very heart of the city centre of Skopje. The building is a work of High modernism. The buildings facade was damaged by the reconstruction for Skopje 2014. 
It was designed by architect Slavko Brezoski prior to the 1963 Skopje earthquake.

References 

Architecture in North Macedonia
Buildings and structures in Skopje
Department store buildings
Buildings and structures completed in 1960
Modernist architecture